This is a list of universities in Moldova.

Public institutions

Private institutions

See also
 Education in Moldova

References

External links
 Instituţii de învăţămînt acreditate (Accredited educational institutions), from the Moldovan Ministry of Education and Youth

Universities
Universities
 
Moldova
Moldova